Puerto Rico Senatorial District VI, also known as the Senatorial District of Guayama, is one of the eight senatorial districts of Puerto Rico. It is currently represented by Miguel Pereira Castillo and Angel M. Rodríguez (from the Popular Democratic Party).

District profile

The Senatorial District VI has an approximate population of 462,202. It covers the following municipalities:
 Aibonito
 Arroyo
 Barranquitas
 Cayey
 Cidra
 Coamo
 Comerío
 Corozal
 Guayama
 Naranjito
 Orocovis
 Salinas
 Santa Isabel
 Villalba
 and some regions of Juana Díaz

In previous distributions, the territory covered by the Senatorial District VI has changed. In 1972, the District didn't include Orocovis, but included Arroyo, Patillas, and Maunabo. It also included all of Juana Díaz. In 1983, Arroyo, Patillas, and Maunabo were reassigned to the District of Humacao, while Orocovis was reassigned to Guayama. In the 1991 redistribution, Morovis was assigned to the district. 

In the 2002 redistribution, Arroyo was assigned to the district, and Morovis was reassigned again to the District of Bayamón. In the 2011 redistribution, some regions of Juana Díaz were assigned to the District of Ponce.

Election results

2012

|-
! style="background-color:#FF0000" |
| style="width: 130px" | Popular Democratic Party (PPD)
|               | Miguel Pereira
| 122,184
| 25.10
| 
|-
! style="background-color:#FF0000" |
| style="width: 130px" | Popular Democratic Party (PPD)
|               | Angel M. Rodríguez
| 120,336
| 24.72
| +1.99
|-
! style="background-color:#0080FF" |
| style="width: 130px" | New Progressive Party (PNP)
|               | Carlos Torres Torres
| 114,916
| 23.60
| -1.59
|-
! style="background-color:#0080FF" |
| style="width: 130px" | New Progressive Party (PNP)
|               | Miguel Rodríguez
| 113,877
| 23.39
| 
|-
! style="background-color:#01DF3A" |
| style="width: 130px" | Puerto Rican Independence Party (PIP)
|               | Edny Ramírez Pagán
| 5,287
| 1.20
| 
|-
! style="background-color:#01DF3A" |
| style="width: 130px" | Puerto Rican Independence Party (PIP)
|               | José Enrique Laboy Gómez
| 5,758
| 1.18
| 
|-
! style="background-color:#008080" |
| style="width: 130px" | Movimiento Unión Soberanista (MUS)
|               | Roberto Colón Ocasio
| 1,127
| 0.23
| 
|-
! style="background-color:#999999" |
| style="width: 130px" | Independent
|               | Benjamín "Bengie" León
| 200
| 0.04
|

2008

|-
! style="background-color:#0080FF" |
| style="width: 130px" | New Progressive Party (PNP)
|               | Carlos Torres Torres
| 131,801
| 25.19%
| 
|-
! style="background-color:#0080FF" |
| style="width: 130px" | New Progressive Party (PNP)
|               | Antonio Soto Díaz
| 130,595
| 24.96
| 
|-
! style="background-color:#FF0000" |
| style="width: 130px" | Popular Democratic Party (PPD)
|               | Eder Ortíz Ortíz
| 119,630
| 22.86
| 
|-
! style="background-color:#FF0000" |
| style="width: 130px" | Popular Democratic Party (PPD)
|               | Angel M. Rodríguez
| 118,950
| 22.73
| -1.01
|-
! style="background-color:#FFBF00" |
| style="width: 130px" | Puerto Ricans for Puerto Rico Party (PPR)
|               | Myrta Rivera Hernández
| 5,352
| 1.02
| 
|-
! style="background-color:#01DF3A" |
| style="width: 130px" | Puerto Rican Independence Party (PIP)
|               | Aida Luz Cruz
| 5,050
| 0.97
| 
|-
! style="background-color:#01DF3A" |
| style="width: 130px" | Puerto Rican Independence Party (PIP)
|               | Nelson Rodríguez Bonilla
| 4,741
| 0.91
| 
|-
! style="background-color:#FFBF00" |
| style="width: 130px" | Puerto Ricans for Puerto Rico Party (PPR)
|               | Angel Rafael Rodríguez
| 4,403
| 0.84
|

2004

|-
! style="background-color:#0080FF" |
| style="width: 130px" | New Progressive Party (PNP)
|               | Margarita Nolasco
| 127,840
| 24.26%
| 
|-
! style="background-color:#FF0000" |
| style="width: 130px" | Popular Democratic Party (PPD)
|               | Cirilo Tirado
| 126,184
| 23.95
| -0.45
|-
! style="background-color:#0080FF" |
| style="width: 130px" | New Progressive Party (PNP)
|               | Osvaldo Ortolaza
| 126,145
| 23.94
| 
|-
! style="background-color:#FF0000" |
| style="width: 130px" | Popular Democratic Party (PPD)
|               | Angel M. Rodríguez
| 125,084
| 23.74
| -0.66
|-
! style="background-color:#01DF3A" |
| style="width: 130px" | Puerto Rican Independence Party (PIP)
|               | María Yadira Díaz
| 10,139
| 1.92
| 
|-
! style="background-color:#01DF3A" |
| style="width: 130px" | Puerto Rican Independence Party (PIP)
|               | Juan Malavé Colón
| 9,053
| 1.72
|

References

External links
Distribución de Distritos Senatoriales de Puerto Rico

Puerto Rico Senatorial districts
Cayey, Puerto Rico
Guayama metropolitan area
Salinas, Puerto Rico